Vijayamitra (ruled 12 BCE - 20 CE) was an Indo-Scythian king of the Apracas who ruled in the north-western region of ancient India, located in Bajaur of modern Pakistan.

Rukhana reliquary
Vijayamitra is mentioned in a recently discovered inscription in Kharoshthi on a Buddhist reliquary  (the "Rukhana reliquary", published by Salomon in 2005), which gives a relationship between several eras of the period, and especially gives confirmation of a Yavana era in relation to the Azes era:

"In the twenty-seventh - 27 - year in the reign of Lord Vijayamitra, the King of the Apraca; in the seventy-third - 73 - year which is called "of Azes", in the two hundred and first - 201 - year of the Yonas (Greeks), on the eighth day of the month of Sravana; on this day was established [this] stupa by Rukhana, the wife of the King of Apraca, [and] by Vijayamitra, the king of Apraca, [and] by Indravarma (Indravasu?), the commander (stratega), [together] with their wives and sons."

This dedication indicates that King Vijayamitra was a follower of Buddhism. His coins also bear the triratna Buddhist symbol.

Since Vijamitra is said to have ruled 27 years already, as the inscription is dated to 16 CE (Year 73 of the Azes era and 201 of the Yavana era), his reign started in 12 BCE, and ended probably a few years after the dedication took place, around 20 CE.

Shinkot casket
Vijamitra also made a second inscription in the Shinkot casket, which had initially been dedicated under the reign of Indo-Greek king Menander I.

Notes

References

History of India
History of Pakistan
1st-century BC Iranian monarchs
1st-century monarchs in Asia